Sally Reeves (born 8 July 1964) is a British former professional tennis player. Following marriage she is now known as Sally Taylor.

A right-handed player, Reeves reached a career high singles ranking of 199 in the world and featured three times in the main draw at Wimbledon. On her Wimbledon debut in 1984 she lost a close first round match to Catherine Tanvier 6–8 in the third set. She made the second round for the only time at the 1985 Wimbledon Championships, where she had a win over fellow British wildcard Rina Einy.

ITF finals

Singles: 2 (0–2)

References

External links
 
 

1964 births
Living people
British female tennis players
English female tennis players